Sergei Vladimirovich Protopopov (Moscow – 14 December 1954, Moscow) was a Russian avant-garde composer and music theorist.

Life 
After studying medicine at the Moscow University, he attended the Kiev Conservatory where he pursued studies of music with theorist Boleslav Yavorsky. He graduated in 1921 and started working as a conductor. During 1938–43, he taught at the Moscow University.

He was associated, as many composers of the Russian avant-garde, with the Association for Contemporary Music. Due to the ideological incompatibility of avant-garde with the contemporary regime supporting socialist realism, his works were mostly unknown following 1931.

Works 
Both in his compositions and in his teaching, Protopopov was a strong supporter of Yavorsky's theories of modal rhythm and tritone. He also maintained a close relationship with him. Protopopov's compositions include three piano sonatas and some vocal works with piano. The piano sonatas were strongly influenced by late Scriabin. Using simultaneously sounding semitones, he created a specific harmony. Technically, they are very demanding for the interpreter, as well as for the instrument—they employ full standard range of piano, sometimes going even beyond that. The piano sonatas are often notated in three staves, and for simplicity accidentals take effect only at the given note.

List of works

Piano works 
 Op. 1. Sonata No. 1
 Op. 5. Sonata No. 2
 Op. 6. Sonata No. 3

Works for voice and piano 
 Op. 4. Dve skazky na narodnyy tekst
 Op. 7. Skazka o divnom gudochke
 Op. 8. Le Printemps de la vie
 Op. 10. 2 Songs
 Op. 11. 2 Love-Songs

Other works 
 Op. 3. Des Lebens Frühling for voice and piano trio
 together with Yavorsky: 5 Folk songs for mixed choir

References 
 Powell, Jonathan. "Protopopov, Sergey Vladimirovich", The New Grove Dictionary of Music and Musicians.

External links 
 
 [ Biography at All Music Guide]
 The Musical Legacy of Sergei Protopopoff by Anton Rovner
Protopopov at Last Fm

1893 births
1954 deaths
Russian composers
Russian male composers
Russian music theorists
Russian avant-garde
Russian music educators
Musicians from Moscow
20th-century composers
20th-century classical pianists
20th-century musicologists
Male classical pianists
20th-century Russian male musicians